Survivalism is preparation for various emergencies as well as possible disruptions in the social or political order.

Survivalism may also refer to:

Survivalism (life after death), a belief in the survival of the conscious self after death

Arts, entertainment, and media
"Survivalism" (song), a song by Nine Inch Nails
Survivalist Party, a fictional political party in the novel Ecotopia Emerging

See also
Survival (disambiguation)
Survivor (disambiguation)
The Survivalist (disambiguation)